Javon McKinley (born April 10, 1998) is an American football wide receiver who is a free agent. He played college football at Notre Dame.

Early life and high school
McKinley grew up in Corona, California and attended Centennial High School. He was named the Los Angeles Times All-Area Back of the Year and The Press-Enterprise All-Area Offensive Player of the Year after 97 receptions for 2,062 yards and 25 touchdowns in his junior season. As a senior, McKinley caught 56 passes for 1,173 yards and 13 touchdowns and played in the All-America Bowl.

College career
McKinley played in six games as a freshman before breaking his left fibula in practice. The injury caused him to miss the entirety of his sophomore season. McKinley played in four games as a junior. Shortly after the end of the season, McKinley was suspended from the team after being charged with three misdemeanors, but was reinstated after entering a pretrial diversion program.

In 2019, McKinley saw his first significant playing time and finished the season with 11 receptions for 268 yards and four touchdowns. McKinley utilized a fifth year of eligibility and caught 42 passes for 717 yards and three touchdowns and was named honorable mention All-Atlantic Coast Conference.

Professional career

Detroit Lions
McKinley signed with the Detroit Lions as an undrafted free agent after the 2021 NFL Draft. He was waived on August 31, 2021 and re-signed to the practice squad the next day. He signed a reserve/future contract with the Lions on January 10, 2022. He was waived on May 12, 2022.

Pittsburgh Steelers
On August 1, 2022, he signed a one-year contract with the Pittsburgh Steelers. On August 11, 2022, he was waived/injured. He cleared waivers and was placed on injured reserve the next day. On August 16, 2022, he was waived with an injury settlement.

References

External links
Notre Dame Fighting Irish bio

1998 births
Living people
American football wide receivers
Detroit Lions players
Notre Dame Fighting Irish football players
Pittsburgh Steelers players
Players of American football from California
Sportspeople from Corona, California